Anusha Yadav (born 1975) is an Indian photographer.

Yadav has received critical attention for her series of photographs titled Impersonations, in which she portrays herself as famous women. The subjects of her impersonations have included Betty Page, Mata Hari and Mehr-un-Nissa.

She is the founder of the Indian Memory Project, an online collection of family photos that documents the history and development of modern India through personal narratives.

Her work is included in the collection of the Museum of Fine Arts, Houston.

References

External links 
 

Living people
1975 births
20th-century Indian photographers
21st-century Indian photographers
20th-century Indian women artists
21st-century Indian women artists